Andrew J. Maloney (October 6, 1931 – August 15, 2022) was an American attorney. He was the United States attorney for the Eastern District of New York from 1986 to 1992.

References 

1931 births
2022 deaths
New York (state) lawyers